In the Beginning is a double album by flutist Hubert Laws released on the CTI and recorded at Rudy Van Gelder's studio in 1974. The album was later reissued on CTI as two separate volumes entitled Then There Was Light.

Reception
Viewed, at the time of its release, as a "Recording of Special Merit" in the estimation of Stereo Review (which, in addition, proclaimed the "recording excellent," the "performance impeccable," and the resulting album a welcome return to Laws' pre-CTI form), In the Beginning would provoke a similarly enthusiastic response decades later from Allmusic's Scott Yanow, who awarded the album 5 stars, stating "This double album features flutist Hubert Laws at his finest. The music ranges from classical-oriented pieces to straight-ahead jazz with touches of '70s funk included in the mix... this recording is one of the most rewarding of Hubert Laws' career". The Penguin Guide to Jazz Recordings describes it as Laws’s “best album and a good, expansive representation of his flute playing.”

Track listing
 "In the Beginning" (Clare Fischer) - 6:53 
 "Restoration" (Harold Blanchard) - 8:59 
 "Gymnopédie No. 1" (Erik Satie) - 3:55 
 "Come Ye Disconsolate" (Traditional) - 5:21 
 "Airegin" (Sonny Rollins) - 5:32 
 "Moment's Notice" (John Coltrane) - 6:56 
 "Reconciliation" (Rodgers Grant) - 10:08 
 "Mean Lene" (Hubert Laws) - 15:28 
Recorded at Van Gelder Studio in Englewood Cliffs, New Jersey on February 6–8 and 11, 1974

Personnel
Hubert Laws - flute, arranger
Ronnie Laws - tenor saxophone
Bob James - keyboards, arranger, conductor
Clare Fischer - piano, electric piano
Richard Tee - organ
Gene Bertoncini - guitar
Ron Carter - bass
Steve Gadd - drums
Dave Friedman - vibraphone
Airto Moreira - percussion
David Nadien - violin
Emanuel Vardi - viola
George Ricci - cello

References

1974 albums
CTI Records albums
Hubert Laws albums
Albums produced by Creed Taylor
Albums recorded at Van Gelder Studio